Tonggui Township is a township under the administration of Xingqing District, Yinchuan, Ningxia, China. , it has 6 villages under its administration.

References 

Township-level divisions of Ningxia
Yinchuan